Apna Khoon is a 1978 Indian Hindi-language action film comedy directed by Babbar Subhash. It stars Ashok Kumar, Shashi Kapoor, Hema Malini, Pran.

Cast
Ashok Kumar as Geeta's Father
Shashi Kapoor as Ram Verma / Raja
Hema Malini as Geeta
Pran as Inspector Verma
Chand Usmani as Shanta Verma
Amjad Khan as Khan
Anwar Hussain as Sundar
Jankidas as Daulatram Shukla
Chandrashekhar as Inspector Anand Chauhan
Rajan Haksar as Chandu

Music
The playback singing was by Asha Bhosle, Mohammed Rafi and Manna Dey, while the music was scored by Sonik Omi.

External links
 

1978 films
1970s Hindi-language films
1970s action comedy films
Indian crime comedy films
Films directed by Babbar Subhash
Films scored by Sonik-Omi
Indian action comedy films
1970s crime comedy films
1978 comedy films